Although Irish Gaelic, Scottish Gaelic, and Manx Gaelic are closely related as Goidelic Celtic languages (or Gaelic languages), they are different in many ways. While most dialects are not immediately mutually comprehensible (although many individual words and phrases are), speakers of the three languages can rapidly develop mutual intelligibility.

Phonetic and grammatical differences

The spoken dialects of Irish and Scottish Gaelic are most similar to one another in Ulster and southwestern Scotland, regions of close geographical proximity to one another. It is thought that the extinct dialect of Galwegian Gaelic, spoken in Galloway in the far south of Scotland, was very similar to Ulster Irish and Manx.

While the dialects of northern Scotland and southern Ireland tend to differ the most from one another in terms of vocabulary, they do share some features which are absent in other dialect areas lying between them. For example, in both Munster Irish and the Gaelic of the north of Scotland, historically short vowels have been diphthongised or lengthened before  fortis sonorants. An example of this is the word  "children of the family".

"the man that's standing at the door" (Standard Irish , Scottish Gaelic ).

The closest to Scottish Gaelic in modern Irish is the dialect currently spoken in County Donegal, as illustrated by the sentence "How are you?".

Ulster Irish:  (plural)  (singular), spelt in 'dialect spelling' as 
Connacht Irish:  (plural),  (singular), in colloquial speech 
Munster Irish:  (plural),  (singular), 

Sibh is used in both Irish and Scottish Gaelic for the plural "you", while Scottish Gaelic [except for the far south] also uses  as a formal version of "you" (much like French uses ; see "T–V distinction"). Modern Irish does not use this formal/informal distinction when addressing people.

The negative particle in Scottish Gaelic, Manx and Northern Ulster Irish is cha/chan (= "is not"; chan is from the Old Irish emphatic negative ).

Scottish Gaelic: 
Ulster Irish: 
Manx: 
Standard Irish: 

Manx spelling, based mainly on English, shows that  is also the underlying form in Manx, the word being spelled .

Eclipsis
The most obvious phonological difference between Irish and Scottish Gaelic is that the phenomenon of eclipsis in Irish is diachronic (i.e. the result of a historical word-final nasal that may or may not be present in modern Irish) but fully synchronic in Scottish Gaelic (i.e. it requires the actual presence of a word-final nasal except for a tiny set of frozen forms). Eclipsis is shown in Irish orthography but not in Scottish Gaelic as it is conditioned by the actual environment.

For example, this means that phrases like Standard Irish , standard Scottish Gaelic †, Manx  is pronounced as follows in different parts of the Gaelic speaking world:

Southern Irish: 
Western and Northern Irish: 
Scottish Gaelic (casual pronunciation, especially Lewis): , more commonly  further south, with fully voiced .

An example of diachronic-type eclipsis are the numbers:
Irish:  "year" >  "8 years"
Scottish Gaelic:  > 

† In conservative speech, Scottish Gaelic feminine nouns also slenderise in the dative (prepositional) case, giving , and so a different final consonant. This feature is uncommon today except in more formal registers and is ignored here.

Orthographic differences
There are a number of distinctive orthographical (written) differences. The spellings of both languages have been reformed in recent decades, which has led to further divergence, though conversely more recent spelling reforms in Scottish Gaelic have reduced the divergences to some extent.

Irish does not use the grave accent, while until recently Scottish Gaelic used the grave and acute accents to differentiate between open and closed vowel sounds. However, recent spelling reform has meant that only grave accents are now in Scottish Gaelic, leaving phonemic distinctions unmarked.

Another difference in Scottish Gaelic is that the aspirate linker  is always hyphenated, while in Irish it is attached to the beginning of the word, as illustrated by the languages' respective names for each other:
Scottish Gaelic — , 
Standard Irish — , 

A number of letter combinations are possible in written Irish which are not found in Scottish Gaelic e.g. , .

Overall, Scottish Gaelic orthography is more conservative than that of Irish.

List of Irish and Scottish Gaelic cognates

Differences in vocabulary

Differences can also be seen in words used for geographical features. For example, "hill" and "mountain" are usually "cnoc" (Knocknapeasta) and "sliabh" (Slieve Donard) respectively in Ireland, but "càrn" (Cairn Gorm) and "beinn" (Ben Nevis) in Scotland. Additionally, "inbhir," meaning "river mouth" and usually Anglicized as "inver" (for example Inverness or Inveraray), very common in Scotland, is almost never seen in Ireland.

Comparison of text
Article 1 of the UDHR in the languages:

See also
 Irish language

References

Gaelic
Goidelic languages
Irish language
Manx language
Scottish Gaelic language